Henry Smith (March 14, 1829  in Cobleskill, Schoharie County, New York – December 1, 1884) was an American lawyer and politician.

Life
He was the son of Thomas Smith, a lawyer.

In 1865, he was elected District Attorney of Albany County, and in 1868 he led the prosecution of George W. Cole (brother of Cornelius Cole) at his trial for the murder of former state assemblyman L. Harris Hiscock.

In the Summer of 1869, he was illegally arrested with other Albany and Susquehanna Railroad executive members during Jay Gould and Jim Fisk's attempt to buy the railroad.

He was a Republican member of the New York State Assembly (Albany Co., 2nd D.) in 1867 and 1872; and was Speaker in 1872. During his Speakership he received a large retainer for legal services rendered to the Erie Railroad at a time when Erie Railroad bills were under debate, which led to accusations that he was bribed to support the bills. The next year a State Senate Investigating Committee probed into this matter.

In 1883, he pronounced his opinion that a "People's Party" should be formed by both Democratic and Republican politicians to oppose "corporate interests" and politicians like John Kelly and  John F. Smyth.

Smith died in Albany on December 1, 1884.  He was buried at Cobleskill Rural Cemetery in Cobleskill.

References

  His view on the forming of a new party, in NYT on September 1, 1883
 Political Graveyard
 Mention in NYT on January 7, 1906
 Assemblymen elected for the Session of 1872, in NYT on December 1, 1871
 Controversy about his legal services to Erie Railroad, in NYT on October 15, 1872
 Proceedings of the State Senate's Erie Railroad Investigation in NYT on March 20, 1873
Google Books Murder on Trial 1620-2002 by Robert Asher, Lawrence B. Goodheart & Alan Rogers (SUNY Press, 2005)
 Obit notice in NYT on December 2, 1884
 Life Sketches of the State Officers, Senators and Members of Assembly in 1867

See also
William M. Tweed

1829 births
1884 deaths
Members of the New York State Assembly
Speakers of the New York State Assembly
Albany County District Attorneys
People from Cobleskill, New York
Politicians from Albany, New York
19th-century American politicians
Lawyers from Albany, New York
19th-century American lawyers